Frances Browne  (16 January 1816 – 21 August 1879) was an Irish poet and novelist, best remembered for her collection of short stories for children, Granny's Wonderful Chair.

Early life
She was born at Stranorlar, in County Donegal, Ireland, the seventh child in a family of twelve children. She was blind as a consequence of an attack of smallpox when she was 18 months old. In her writings, she recounts how she learned by heart the lessons which her brothers and sisters said aloud every evening, and how she bribed them to read to her by doing their chores. She then worked hard at memorising all that she had heard.

She composed her first poem, a version of "The Lord's Prayer", when she was seven years of age.

First publications
In 1841, Browne's first poems were published in the Irish Penny Journal and in the London Athenaeum. One included in the Irish Penny Journal was the lyric "Songs of Our Land", which can be found in anthologies of Irish patriotic verse. She published a complete volume of poems in 1844 and a second volume in 1847. The provincial newspapers, especially the Belfast-based Northern Whig, reprinted many, and she became widely known as 'The Blind Poetess of Ulster'.

In 1845, she made her first contribution to the popular magazine Chambers's Edinburgh Journal, for which she wrote for the next 25 years. The first story of hers published there, in March 1845, was "The Lost New Year's Gift", which tells of a poor dressmaker in London and exemplifies her story-telling abilities.

She also contributed short stories to magazines with a largely female readership, for example, a number in the 1850s to the Ladies' Companion, a magazine read by many well-to-do women of the Victorian era. Stories she contributed there included the amusing "Mrs Sloper's Swan" and an eerie tale set in County Fermanagh, called "The Botheration of Ballymore".

Emigration to Edinburgh
In 1847, she left Donegal for Edinburgh with one of her sisters as her reader and amanuensis. She quickly established herself in literary circles, and wrote essays, reviews, stories, and poems, in spite of health problems. In 1852, she moved to London, where she wrote her first novel, My Share of the World (1861). Her best known work, Granny's Wonderful Chair, was published in 1856, remains in print to this day, and has been translated into several languages. It is a richly imaginative collection of fairy stories. It was also in 1856 that her third volume of poetry appeared – Pictures and Songs of Home. This was directed at very young children and contains beautiful illustrations. The poems focus on her childhood experiences in County Donegal and provide evocative descriptions of its countryside.

London and later life
After her move to London, Browne wrote frequently for the Religious Tract Society's periodicals The Leisure Hour and The Sunday at Home. One of those in The Leisure Hour was "1776: a tale of the American War of Independence", which appeared on the centenary of that event in 1876. As well as describing some of the revolutionary events, it is a love story and beautifully illustrated. Her last piece of writing was a poem called "The Children's Day", which appeared in The Sunday at Home in 1879.

Frances Browne died on 21 August 1879 at 19 St John's Grove, Richmond upon Thames. She was buried in Richmond Cemetery on 25 August 1879.

Further reading
The most detailed biography is The Life and Works of Frances Browne by Patrick Bonar, self-published c. 2008.

There is an analysis of some of her short stories in the 2008 Donegal Annual: "Frances Browne and the Legends of Ulster" by Raymond Blair. Blair also edited an anthology of her poems, short stories and essays: The Best of Frances Browne (Limavady: Rathmore Books, c. 2012).

Browne's career is treated by Paul Marchbanks in Irish Women Writers: An A-to-Z Guide, edited by Alexander G. Gonzalez (Westport, Conn.: Greenwood; Oxford: Harcourt Education, 2006).

Thomas McLean examines her longest poem, "The Star of Attéghéi", and its relationship to the war in Circassia in a 2012 monograph, The Other East and Nineteenth-Century British Literature.

A brief entry on Browne appears in the Dictionary of Irish Biography, published under the auspices of the Royal Irish Academy.

References

External links

 
 
 
Granny's Wonderful Chair and Its Tales of Fairy Times, by Frances Browne, introduced and illustrated by Katharine Pyle. New York: E. P. Dutton & Co., 1916.
Granny's Wonderful Chair, by Frances Browne, illustrated by Florence White Williams. New York: The Saalfield Publishing Company, 1928; Illustration copyright not renewed.
Bibliography of Frances Browne's works
 

1816 births
1887 deaths
Irish blind people
Irish women short story writers
19th-century Irish short story writers
Irish women poets
People from Stranorlar
Irish folklorists
Irish women novelists
19th-century Irish poets
19th-century Irish novelists
19th-century Irish women writers
Burials at Richmond Cemetery